André Menez (September 12, 1943, in Vire – February 2, 2008, in Versailles) was a French biologist, who served as president of the National Museum of Natural History, France from 2006 to 2008. As a biologist, he specialised in the toxicology of snakes, scorpions, and sea anemones. He was knighted with the Legion of Honour, and the National Ordre du Merit.

References 

1943 births
2008 deaths
French biologists